Machados (population 11.802) is a city in northeastern Brazil, in the State of Pernambuco. It is the largest producer of bananas of the state, with over 21.000 ton.

Geography
 State – Pernambuco
 Region – Agreste of Pernambuco
 Boundaries – São Vicente Ferrer  (N);  Bom Jardim   (S and E);  Orobó  (W).
 Area – 
 Elevation – 
 Hydrography – Goiana River
 Vegetation – Subcaducifólia forest
 Annual average temperature – 
 Distance to Recife –

Economy

The main economic activities in Machados are related with commerce and agribusiness, especially bananas, sugarcane and  cattle.

Economic Indicators

Economy by Sector (2006)

Health Indicators

Twin towns — sister cities

Machados is twinned with:

References

Municipalities in Pernambuco